The 2015 British National Track Championships were a series of track cycling competitions held from 25–27 September 2015 at the Manchester Velodrome. They are organised and sanctioned by British Cycling, and were open to British cyclists.

Competition
Separate competitions will be held for both men and women, and 6 events are also included for paracyclists

Open to British cyclists, the winners of each event are entitled to wear the national champion's jersey - a white jersey with a red, white and blue front stripe - for the next year when competing in that discipline. Twenty-two gold medals will be awarded over three days and six sessions; the event had previously taken place over 5 days.

The women's sprint events were dominated by rising star Katy Marchant, as she matched the 4 gold clean sweep of the sprint events achieved by Jessica Varnish in 2014. The women's endurance events were dominated by Laura Trott winning each of the individual endurance races ahead of main rival of the championships Katie Archibald. Archibald's victory in team pursuit being the sole race Trott was unable to win. Such was her dominance that Trott only just missed out on medals in sprint events as well, finishing a very close fourth in the 500 metre time trial.

On the men's side, unpredictable racing was the order of the day. With defending quadruple champion Callum Skinner injured and not competing, the remaining elite sprinters, Jason Kenny, Matt Crampton and Lewis Oliva shared the spoil's between themselves, with Kenny combining with Crampton and Philip Hindes to take team sprint honours.

Medal summary

Men's Events

Women's Events

Para-cycling Events
A series of para-cycling national championships are also held over combined categories using a points system.

A.T. = Actual Time
F.T. = Factored time

References

National Track Championships
British National Track Championships